Nikos Mihas (born November 20, in Athens, Greece) is a Greek singer-songwriter of the new age of Greek rock stars.

Early life

From an early age he showed an interest in music. He started by playing the piano at the age of 10 and a few years later he formed a band with his brother and some friends. The band was called "NIMA" (derived from the first letters of their names, NIkos-MAkis). Some years later he went to Romania to study Medicine and become a doctor. He never left his dream however, which was to become a singer, so he entered the TV talent show "Fame Story 2".

Fame Story (2004)

In 2004, he decided to take part in the talent show "Fame Story 2", shown on the Greek TV channel ANT1, where he was one of the favourites to make it to the finals due to his unique style of performing and his low-profile character. One week before the final, however, he was eliminated from the show but for the first time in a Greek talent show he performed a song that he wrote; a move that many other contestants followed in the years to come. "Party" was a huge success at the time, even without being physically released in the music market.

Songs performed on Fame Story

Professional career (2005–)

A year after, in the summer of 2005, he saw the release of his first personal album. It was called "Sti Hora Tou Pote" ("Into Neverland") and included many major hit-singles. It contains 12 songs written mostly by him and his band and with contributions of other songwriters.

In March 2007 his second album "Trehei Tipota?" was released. It contains 12 songs in a rock-alternative style including some beautiful ballads. The album also contains a cover of the 3 Doors Down song "When I'm Gone" in Greek lyrics. The record has received mixed reviews from Greek critics.

He is currently in progress of releasing his third album.

In early 2010, "Poso Sou Moiazo" was released as a digital single and video.

Discography

Studio albums
Sti Hora Tou Pote – "Στη Χώρα Του Ποτέ" (2005)
Trehei Tipota? – "Τρέχει Τίποτα" (2007)
Stigmes – "Στιγμές" (2016)

Singles&LP
Ekeini – "Εκείνη" (2018)
Dos' Mou Anaptira – "Δωσ' Μου Αναπτήρα" (2020)

Music videos
 Party
 Simadia Kairou
 Hronia Kathreftes
 Mpou***lo
 Ta Paidia Ton Balkonion
 Poso Sou Moiazo

Awards

MAD Video Music Awards

The MAD Video Music Awards are awarded annually by the Greek music channel MAD TV since 2004. Nikos Mihas has received 2 awards from 5 nominations.

|-
|rowspan="2"| 2006 ||rowspan="2"| "Party" || Best Video Rock || 
|-
|Best New Artist Video || 
|-
|rowspan="2"| 2008 ||rowspan="2"| "Mpou***lo" || Best Video Rock || 
|-
|Sexiest Video || 
|-
|rowspan="1"| 2009 ||rowspan="1"| "Ta Paidia Ton Mpalkonion" || Best Video Rock ||

References

External links 
 Nikos Mihas profile on music.net.cy

Living people
Singers from Athens
21st-century Greek male singers
Greek rock singers
Heaven Music artists
Year of birth missing (living people)